The John Henry Turf Championship Stakes (renamed for John Henry who won it three times) is an American Thoroughbred horse race run annually during the Oak Tree Racing Association's Autumn Meeting at Santa Anita Park in Arcadia, California.

It is raced over a  distance of one and one-quarter miles on the turf and is one of the final prep races leading to the Breeders' Cup Turf.  Once a Grade I event, it is now a Grade II and open to horses three years old and up. It currently offers a purse of $200,000.

Inaugurated as the Oak Tree Stakes in 1969, from 1971 through 1995 it was called the Oak Tree Invitational Stakes, and from 1996 through 1999, the Oak Tree Turf Championship Stakes.  From 2000 through 2011 it was called the Clement L. Hirsch Turf Championship Stakes.  The race, now named for John Henry, remains at Santa Anita although the Oak Tree Autumn Meeting was held at Hollywood Park until its closure in December, 2013.

From 1969 through 1994 it was raced at  a distance of  miles.

In winning the 2008 edition, Red Giant set a world record time of 1:57.16 for  miles on turf.

Records
Time record: (at current  miles distance)
 1:57.16 – Red Giant (2008)

Most wins:
 3 – John Henry (1980, 1981, 1982)

Most wins by an owner:
 3 – Dotsam Stable (1980, 1981, 1982)

Most wins by a jockey:
 8 – Bill Shoemaker (1971, 1972, 1975, 1976, 1977, 1978, 1981, 1982)

Most wins by a trainer:
 9 – Charles Whittingham (1970, 1971, 1972, 1974, 1975, 1976, 1978, 1979, 1986)

Winners

± In 1987 the winning time may have been affected because the race was started on the backstretch instead of from its normal hillside position.† In 1996, Bon Point finished first but was disqualified and set back to fifth place.‡ In 2010 run at Hollywood Park.

Notes

References
 The Clement L. Hirsch Turf Championship at Pedigree Query

Open middle distance horse races
Grade 1 turf stakes races in the United States
Horse races in California
1969 establishments in California
Turf races in the United States
Santa Anita Park
Sports competitions in Los Angeles County, California
Recurring sporting events established in 1969